Sally Julini (born 1 January 2003) is a Swiss footballer who plays for French Division 1 Féminine club En Avant Guingamp, on loan from Olympique Lyonnais, and the Switzerland national team.

Early life
Julini was born in Geneva to a French father of Ivorian and Guadeloupean descent and a Swiss mother.

Club career 
After training at the Swiss national center in Biel since the age of 12, Sally Julini then played with the men's youth teams of Meyrin FC and the U15s of Servette FC, before joining Olympique Lyonnais youth academy in 2019.

She played her first D1 match on the 2 October 2020 against Fleury, soon also making her Champions League debut on the following 15 December, against Juventus.

International career 
Called with the youth selections of the France team on several occasions since the summer 2020, she finally opted for the Swiss selection, that she was first selected for in April 2021 for the Euro 2022 qualifaying against the Czech Republic.

She made her international debut for Switzerland on the 17 September 2021, during a World Cup qualifaying against Lithuania.

References

External links

2003 births
Living people
People from Carouge
Sportspeople from the canton of Geneva
Women's association football midfielders
Switzerland women's international footballers
France women's youth international footballers
Olympique Lyonnais Féminin players
En Avant Guingamp (women) players
Division 1 Féminine players
Swiss people of Ivorian descent
Swiss people of French descent
French sportspeople of Ivorian descent
French people of Swiss descent
Swiss women's footballers
French women's footballers